Lucy Crown is a novel by American author Irwin Shaw.  First published in 1956, it was Shaw's third novel, following The Young Lions and The Troubled Air.

Principal Characters
 Lucy Crown, wife and mother
 Oliver Crown, her husband
 Anthony (Tony) Crown, their son
 Jeffrey Bunner, Lucy's lover

Plot summary

Lucy, an orphan, marries Oliver, a successful but frustrated businessman. Oliver's ambitions are thwarted when his father dies and Oliver is forced to run the family business. He proves to be a controlling husband. Lucy, who suffers from self-esteem issues, is intimidated by him and gives up her career aspirations.

In the summer of 1937, Oliver leaves Lucy (now age 35) and son Tony (age 13) alone at a lake resort for several weeks while he attends to business. During Oliver's absence Lucy is pursued by Jeffrey, a Dartmouth College undergraduate they have hired to be a companion for Tony. She resists Jeffrey's advances but they eventually begin what Lucy regards as a casual affair. Tony sees them having intercourse and tells his father, who confronts the couple. Lucy and Oliver remain married, but she insists that she will have nothing further to do with her son. Tony becomes embittered and cuts off all contact with his mother. Lucy's deliberate act of infidelity and betrayal leads to the disintegration of her marriage and complete estrangement from her son.

During World War II, Tony is unable to serve in the military due to poor health. Oliver joins the U.S. Army and is away from home for several years. Lucy embarks on a series of affairs with other men during Oliver's absence. Before leaving for combat in Europe, a despondent Oliver attempts to explain his frustrations and unhappiness to his son:

″You reach a certain age, say twenty-five, thirty, it varies with your intelligence, and you begin to say, “Oh, Christ, this is for nothing. You begin to realize it’s just more of the same, only getting worse every day... I used to have a high opinion of myself... and then, in fifteen minutes in a little stinking summer resort beside a lake, the whole thing collapsed.″

A decade after the war is over, Lucy (now aged 60) visits Paris and unexpectedly encounters her son. She learns that he is married with a son, is living in Paris and is working as a cartoon artist. She immediately sees through his façade and realizes that, while keeping up appearances, he is leading an unhappy life. She attempts to explain to Tony why her marriage with Oliver failed:

″Your father was a passionate and disappointed man. When he was young, he had high hopes for himself ...he saw himself as a nobody, a failure and all the passion and disappointment of his life he centered on me. He frightened me and he expected too much from me and he directed every move of my life and a good deal of the time he didn’t satisfy me... I was timid and uncertain and vengeful and I had a low opinion of myself, so I went out looking for a good opinion of myself in the arms of other men. At first I told myself I was looking for love, but it wasn't so. I didn't find love and I didn't find a good opinion. And it wasn't as though I didn't try.″

Together Lucy and Tony visit the French village where Oliver was killed in combat during the war. This eventually leads to a partial reconciliation of mother and son.

Critical Reception
A number of critics felt that the novel was not up to the standard of Shaw's past work. Among their objections were that the plot was less than credible, the characters underdeveloped and the subject matter mundane compared with the social issues Shaw had treated in his earlier writing.

Also coloring the critics' assessment was the growing perception that Shaw had chosen to sacrifice literary acclaim for commercial success, and had retreated from the idealistic left-wing sentiments expressed in his earliest work. Fueling this concern, prior to publication Shaw was able to sell the film rights to the novel for $400,000, a payment perceived as very high at that time.

The Saturday Review noted that the novel tackles moral dilemmas such as whether an intelligent woman should allow herself to be stifled by her husband; whether adultery is a form of rebellion; and whether a child should be forced to bear the full price of a parent's infidelity.  Kirkus Reviews found the novel bleak but praised Shaw for his storytelling talent.

References

1956 American novels
Adultery in novels
Novels by Irwin Shaw
Random House books